This is a list of the 10 members of the European Parliament for Ireland appointed to the delegation from the Oireachtas as a result of the Irish accession to the European Economic Community on 1 January 1973. The first delegation, served only two months, from 1 January 1973 until the 1973 general election in February.

See also
Members of the European Parliament 1958–1979 – List by country

External links
ElectionsIreland.org – January 1973 Delegation
European Parliament office in Ireland – Irish MEPs: 1973–79

1973a
1973 in Ireland
List
Ireland